Broken Circle / Spiral Hill EP is the second EP by Lee Ranaldo. It was released in 1994, and is Lee's third official release. It was released on the Starlight Furniture Co. as a 7" single (containing just the first two tracks) and as a five track CD-EP. The album is a mix of guitar drone and spoken word pieces, and ending with a Sebadoh cover.

Track listing

"Broken Circle" - 3:48
"Spiral Hill" - 3:55
"Bloomington, Indiana [Early Version]" - 2:34
"Midnight Headlights" - 3:46
"Brand New Love" - 2:33

Personnel

Michael Morley – Drawing
Lee Ranaldo – Guitar

References

Info about EP link

Lee Ranaldo albums
1994 EPs